South Twin Mountain is a mountain located in Grafton County, New Hampshire. The mountain is part of the Twin Range of the White Mountains.  South Twin forms the high point of a north–south ridge, with North Twin Mountain lying approximately one mile to the north and Mount Guyot two miles (3 km) to the southeast.  Galehead Mountain, a lower spur of South Twin, is to the west.

The east face of South Twin drains into the Little River, thence into the Ammonoosuc and Connecticut Rivers, and into Long Island Sound in Connecticut. The northwest slopes of South Twin drain to the North Branch of the Gale River, another tributary of the Ammonoosuc River.  Southwest of South Twin Mountain is the valley of Twin Brook, which flows into the Franconia Branch of the East Branch of the Pemigewasset River, through the Pemigewasset Wilderness, thence into the Pemigewasset and Merrimack Rivers, and into the Gulf of Maine in Massachusetts.

The summit of South Twin is open and rocky, but stands of spruce and fir trees grow in close proximity.  The Appalachian Trail, a 2,170-mile (3,500-km) National Scenic Trail from Georgia to Maine, crosses the summit of South Twin, passing from Galehead Mountain (and Galehead Hut) to the west towards Mount Guyot to the southeast.  The North Twin Trail proceeds north along the ridge crest to the summit of North Twin.

See also

 List of mountains in New Hampshire
 White Mountain National Forest

External links
 
 
 AMC: Hiking South Twin
  hikethewhites.com: South Twin

Mountains of New Hampshire
South Twin
New England Four-thousand footers
Mountains on the Appalachian Trail